The Ondo State Government House is the official quarters of the executive members of the Ondo State Government.
The government house is located in Alagbaka, a town in Akure, the capital of Ondo State southwestern Nigeria.

References

Official residences in Nigeria